Moustier-Ventadour is a commune in the Corrèze department in central France.

Geography
The Luzège forms most of the commune's eastern boundary.

Population

Personalities
Bernart de Ventadorn, medieval troubadour

See also
 Château de Ventadour
Communes of the Corrèze department

References

Communes of Corrèze